Paul Robert Fox (May 22, 1954 – December 25, 2022) was an American record producer, who was best known for producing such recording artists as Faker, The Green Children, Gene Loves Jezebel, 10,000 Maniacs, XTC, Phish, Texas, Sunfall Festival, Robyn Hitchcock and the Egyptians, The Sugarcubes, Too Much Joy, They Might Be Giants, Edwin McCain, Semisonic, and Grant Lee Buffalo.

Fox also played as a session player with the Pointer Sisters, Rod Stewart, Patti LaBelle, Mötley Crüe, DeBarge, and Natalie Cole among others.

Personal life and death
Fox was diagnosed with Early-onset Alzheimer's disease in 2012. He practiced yoga.

Fox died on December 25, 2022, at the age of 68.

Discography

References

1954 births
2022 deaths
American record producers